Gonojana is a genus of moths in the family Eupterotidae erected by Per Olof Christopher Aurivillius in 1893.

Species
 Gonojana crowleyi (Aurivillius, 1904)
 Gonojana dimidiata (Aurivillius, 1893)
 Gonojana magnifica (Rothschild, 1917)
 Gonojana tristis (Druce, 1896)
 Gonojana velutina (Walker)

References

Janinae
Moth genera